Tebolt Run is a  long 2nd order tributary to Big Sandy Creek in Fayette County, Pennsylvania.  This is the only stream of this name in the United States.

Course
Tebolt Run rises about 1 mile northeast of Devies Mountain, and then flows east-southeast to join Big Sandy Creek about 4 miles northwest of Clifton Mills, West Virginia.

Watershed
Tebolt Run drains  of area, receives about 50.5 in/year of precipitation, has a wetness index of 326.79, and is about 96% forested.

See also
List of rivers of Pennsylvania

References

Rivers of Pennsylvania
Rivers of Fayette County, Pennsylvania